Juan Martín del Potro (born 23 September 1988) is an Argentinian former professional tennis player. Del Potro's biggest achievement is a major title: the 2009 US Open, where he defeated Rafael Nadal in the semifinals and the five-time defending champion Roger Federer in the final. He was the only man outside the Big Three (Novak Djokovic, Federer, and Nadal) to win a major between the 2005 French Open and the 2012 US Open, a span of 30 tournaments.

Del Potro's other career highlights include reaching the 2018 US Open final, winning an Olympic bronze medal in men's singles at the 2012 London Olympics and the silver medal at the 2016 Rio Olympics, winning Indian Wells in 2018, and leading Argentina to the 2016 Davis Cup title; but his career has also been hampered by a succession of wrist and knee injuries. Del Potro first entered the top 10 of the ATP rankings on 6 October 2008. In January 2010, he reached a then-career-high ranking of world No. 4, after which he withdrew from most of the season due to a right wrist injury. In 2016, del Potro led Argentina to its first ever Davis Cup title by defeating Croatia's Marin Čilić in the final from two sets down. He reached his first major semifinal in four years by defeating Federer in the quarterfinals of the 2017 US Open. In 2018, he won his first Masters 1000 title at the Indian Wells Masters, defeating the defending champion and world No. 1 Federer in the final. After reaching the semifinals of the 2018 French Open, he matched his career-high ranking of No. 4, and in August 2018 he reached the world No. 3 ranking for the first time. At the 2018 US Open, he reached his second major final, where he lost to Novak Djokovic. Del Potro did not play between June 2019 and February 2022 because of pain from a knee injury, and said he would retire as a result.

Early life
Juan Martín del Potro was born in Tandil, Argentina. His father, Daniel del Potro (1957–2021), played semi-professional rugby union in Argentina and was a veterinarian. His mother, Patricia Lucas, is a teacher and he has a younger sister named Julieta. He also had an elder sister who died when she was 8 years old in a car accident. Del Potro speaks Spanish, English and some Italian.

Aside from tennis, he enjoys playing association football and supports the Boca Juniors team in Argentina and Juventus in Italy. He would often dedicate time to both sports during his youth, and Argentine-Italian international footballer Mauro Camoranesi, who grew up in the same town, remains a close friend of del Potro.

Del Potro began playing tennis at the age of seven with coach Marcelo Gómez (who also coached Tandil-born players Juan Mónaco, Mariano Zabaleta and Máximo González). Del Potro's talent was discovered by Italian ex-tennis professional Ugo Colombini, who accompanied him through the initial phases of his young career, and is still today his agent and close friend. When questioned about his ambitions in tennis he replied, "I dream of winning a Grand Slam and the Davis Cup." Despite refusing to participate in the Davis Cup several times, he has since achieved both goals. He is a Roman Catholic.

Tennis career

Junior years
Del Potro played his first junior match in April 2003 at the age of 14 at a grade 2 tournament in Italy. As a junior in 2002, del Potro won the Orange Bowl 14s title, beating Marin Čilić en route to a victory over Pavel Tchekov in the final. In 2003, at the age of 14, del Potro received wild cards to three ITF Circuit events in Argentina, where he lost in straight sets in the first round of each.

As a junior, del Potro reached as high as No. 3 in the combined junior world rankings in January 2005.

Junior Grand Slam results - Singles:

Australian Open: A (-)
French Open: QF (2005)
Wimbledon: 2R (2004)
US Open: 1R (2004)

2004–2005: Early career 
In May 2004, del Potro won his first senior match, at the age of 15, at the ITF Circuit event in Buenos Aires by defeating Matias Niemiz. He then went on to lose in three sets to Sebastián Decoud in the second round. His next victory came over five months later against the Chilean Álvaro Loyola in a tournament in Antofagasta. Later that year, del Potro reached the quarterfinals of the ITF Circuit event in Campinas, Brazil; recording victories over Henrique Mello and Alessandro Camarço. Del Potro won two more matches before the end of the year and saw his world ranking rise from no. 1441 in August to no. 1077 in November. He also reached the finals in the Argentina Cup and Campionati Internazionali D'Italia Junior tournaments.

Del Potro reached his first final of the ITF Junior Circuit on 11 January 2005, the "Copa del Cafe (Coffee Bowl)" Junior ITF Tournament in Costa Rica, where he lost to Robin Haase in three sets. He was involved in a dispute with the umpire during this match, who decided to stop play because of rain, which del Potro believed favoured Haase. Because of the rain delays, the final set had to be played indoors; this was the first time the indoor courts had been used in the 44-year history of the youth tournament.

At the age of 16, del Potro reached his first senior singles final at the Futures tournament in Berimbau Naucalpan, Mexico, where he lost to Darko Mađarovski. He then went on to win consecutive titles at two Future ITF Circuit events in Santiago, Chile, including the 26th International Junior tournament. In the first tournament, he beat Jorge Aguilar, and in the second, he did not drop a set in the whole tournament and defeated Thiago Alves in the final, a player ranked more than 400 places higher at the time. He won his third title in his home country by defeating Damián Patriarca, who forfeited the match, at the ITF Circuit event in Buenos Aires.

Del Potro turned professional after the Italy F17 event in Bassano, and in his first professional tournament, the Lines Trophy in Reggio Emilia, he reached the semifinals, where he lost to countryman Martín Vassallo Argüello in three sets. Two tournaments later, he reached the final of the Credicard Citi MasterCard Tennis Cup in Campos do Jordão, Brazil, where he lost to André Sá in straight sets. After turning 17, he won the Montevideo Challenger by defeating Boris Pašanski in the final in three sets. That same year, he failed in his first attempt to qualify for his first Grand Slam, at the US Open, losing in the first round to Paraguayan Ramón Delgado. Throughout 2005, del Potro jumped over 900 positions to finish with a world ranking of no. 157, largely due to winning three Futures tournaments. He was the youngest player to finish in the year-end top 200.

2006: Top 100
In February, del Potro played his first ATP tour event in Viña del Mar, where he defeated Albert Portas, before losing to Fernando González in the second round. Later, seeded seventh, he won the Copa Club Campestre de Aguascalientes by defeating the likes of Dick Norman and Thiago Alves, before beating Sergio Roitman in the final.

Del Potro qualified for the main draw of his first Grand Slam in the 2006 French Open at the age of 17. He lost in the opening round to former French Open champion and 24th seed Juan Carlos Ferrero. Having received a wild card, he reached the quarterfinals of the ATP event in Umag, Croatia, where he lost in three sets to the eventual champion, Stanislas Wawrinka. In Spain, he participated in the Open Castilla y León Challenger tournament held in Segovia, defeating top seed Fernando Verdasco in the quarterfinals and Benjamin Becker in the final.

Del Potro qualified for his first US Open in 2006, after being seeded ninth in the qualifying stages, where he beat Brian Vahaly, Wayne Arthurs, and Daniel Köllerer in straight sets. In the US Open, he lost in the first round to fellow qualifier Alejandro Falla of Colombia in four sets. He went on to qualify for his first ATP Masters Series tournament in Spain, the Mutua Madrileña Madrid Open, where he lost in the first round to Joachim Johansson. After receiving a wild card thanks to Roger Federer, he reached the quarterfinals of the 2006 Davidoff Swiss Indoors in Basel, Switzerland; defeating lucky loser Tobias Clemens in the first round and George Bastl in the second round, before losing to the eventual runner-up Fernando González in three sets. Del Potro finished 2006 as the youngest player in the top 100 at 18 years, 2 months.

2007: Top 50, Davis Cup quarterfinal

Del Potro began the year by reaching his first semifinal in ATP Adelaide, Australia, where he lost to Chris Guccione, having beaten Igor Kunitsyn earlier in the day. He then reached the second round of the Australian Open, where he had to retire because of injury in his match against eventual finalist Fernando González in the fifth set. In February, del Potro played for Argentina in the first round of the Davis Cup against Austria, winning the fourth and deciding match against Jürgen Melzer in five sets, allowing Argentina to qualify for the quarterfinals.

Del Potro defeated Feliciano López before losing to eventual semifinalist Mardy Fish in the second round of the indoor Regions Morgan Keegan Championships. In his next ATP Masters event, he reached the second round of the Pacific Life Open, beating Gustavo Kuerten in the first round, but then losing to Richard Gasquet. Del Potro went further in the Sony Ericsson Open, reaching the fourth round, after he defeated three top-50 players: Jonas Björkman, Marcos Baghdatis, and Mikhail Youzhny, before falling to Rafael Nadal in two sets. In May, he lost in the first round of the French Open to eventual champion Nadal.

In his first grass-court event, del Potro beat Thomas Johansson in two sets and reached the second round at the Queen's Club, where he lost to Nadal. He also reached the quarterfinals in Nottingham the following week; there he beat British qualifier Jamie Baker and Kunitsyn in the first two rounds, but lost to Ivo Karlović at the quarterfinal stage. At his inaugural Wimbledon Championships, he defeated Davide Sanguinetti in the first round, before losing to eventual champion Roger Federer in the second round, after a rain delay in the third set.

Del Potro lost to Frank Dancevic in three sets in the second round of the singles at the ATP event in Indianapolis. At the same event, partnered with Travis Parrott in doubles, he won his first doubles tournament, defeating Teymuraz Gabashvili and Karlović in the final. He regards this as a special victory, "It was fantastic to play doubles with Parrott. I'm so happy because I've never won a doubles tournament. For the rest of my life, I will remember this tournament." Del Potro qualified for the ATP Masters Series event in Cincinnati, where he reached the third round. He defeated countryman Guillermo Cañas in the first round and Philipp Kohlschreiber in the second, before losing to former world No. 1 Carlos Moyá. At that year's US Open, he defeated Nicolas Mahut and Melzer, before losing to eventual finalist and third seed Novak Djokovic in the third round. He also reached the third round of the Madrid Masters by beating Potito Starace and Tommy Robredo, before losing to eventual champion David Nalbandian in straight sets. In the last tournament of the year, the Paris Masters, he reached the second round, where he lost to Nikolay Davydenko. That year, del Potro was the youngest player to finish in the year-end top 50 at 19 years, 2 months.

2008: First titles, Davis Cup final, top 10

Del Potro's first half of the season was hampered by injuries and a change of coach, starting with a first-round loss in Adelaide, where he was the seventh seed. He then made it to the second round of the Australian Open in January, only to retire against David Ferrer due to an injury. Del Potro returned to the circuit in March, winning his first match against Jesse Levine at the Sony Ericsson Open, before losing in the second round to López. Struggling with injuries, his ranking fell as low as no. 81 in April. "At the start of the year, I was playing good, but I had many injuries, many problems with my body, with my physique", said del Potro. "I changed my coach, changed my physical trainer, I changed everything."

In May, del Potro had to retire again, this time in a first-round match against Andy Murray at the Rome Masters. During the second set, the Argentine allegedly made derogatory comments about Murray's mother which resulted in a complaint to the umpire. Del Potro's serve was subsequently broken three times in a row, and he suffered a back injury, which caused his retirement. In his second Grand Slam of the year, the French Open, he was eliminated in the second round by Simone Bolelli in four sets. In June, he reached the semifinals of the Ordina Open, losing to eventual winner and top seed David Ferrer in straight sets. For the second year in a row, he was knocked out of Wimbledon in the second round; he won his first-round clash with Pavel Šnobel in straight sets, but then lost to Stanislas Wawrinka.

A successful summer followed for the Argentine. In July, del Potro and his team decided to remain in Europe to test his fitness. "We decided to play on clay courts for my back because if I start to play again on hard courts, maybe I will injure it again", he recalled. Del Potro won his first career ATP tour title at the Mercedes Cup in Stuttgart, defeating Gasquet in straight sets in the final. A week later, del Potro reached his second career ATP Tour final at the Austrian Open in Kitzbühel, where he beat local hope and sixth seed Melzer in less than an hour, to claim his second title in two weeks. Having competed in just two clay tournaments all of the 2007 season, he never thought he would win his first two titles on clay courts.

In August, del Potro won his third consecutive title at the Countrywide Classic in Los Angeles, beating Andy Roddick in straight sets in the final. After the match, Roddick praised his opponent. "[Del Potro] hits this way and this way kind of equally and he can hit it from inside out and running to it, which is a good thing for him, bad for the rest of us". A fourth consecutive title followed a week later in the Legg Mason Tennis Classic in Washington, D.C., where he recorded a victory over Viktor Troicki, becoming the first player in ATP history to win his first four career titles in as many tournaments. "I don't really understand what I did. It is difficult to believe that I have won four consecutive titles", del Potro said, crediting coach Franco Davín for his impressive run. "He changed my game. He changed my mind. He changed everything. When I play and I see him in the stands, it gives me confidence. I can play relaxed."

At the 2008 US Open, del Potro progressed to the third round, where he won his first match to five sets in the circuit against Gilles Simon to reach the round of 16. He went on to defeat Japanese teenager Kei Nishikori in straight sets. In the quarterfinals, he was stopped by eventual finalist Murray, losing after almost four hours. The defeat came after 23 consecutive victories: the second-longest winning streak in 2008 and the longest winning streak by a player outside the top 10 in the last 20 years.

Del Potro was selected to play his first home-based Davis Cup tie, between Argentina and Russia. He won his first singles match against Davydenko in three sets. He also won the fifth and deciding match against Igor Andreev in straight sets, booking Argentina a place in the final.

At the AIG Japan Open Tennis Championships, he made the final by defeating 11th seed Jarkko Nieminen, top seed and defending champion Ferrer, and fourth seed Richard Gasquet. He was defeated by Tomáš Berdych in the final. At the Madrid Masters, he lost in the quarterfinals in straight sets to Roger Federer. He reached the semifinals of his next tournament, the Davidoff Swiss Indoors, before losing to countryman Nalbandian. He was beaten by Nalbandian again in his next tournament, this time it was in the second round of the Paris Masters. Del Potro blamed fatigue for his defeat, "It's difficult to play the last tournament of the year. I was tired, my mind was in Argentina [the venue for the Davis Cup final]". This left del Potro's qualification for the 2008 Tennis Masters Cup out of his hands, but Jo-Wilfried Tsonga beat James Blake in the semifinals, which was enough to ensure his place at the year-end event.

Del Potro won one match at the Masters Cup, against Tsonga, but lost his other two matches against the higher-ranked Djokovic and Davydenko, meaning that he exited the tournament in the round-robin stage. This was his last event of the year on the ATP Tour. He went on to lose one match in the Davis Cup final, against López, as his team succumbed to a 3–1 loss against Spain. He withdrew from his second match due to a thigh injury and was replaced by José Acasuso. Nonetheless, del Potro enjoyed a successful season; winning four titles and finishing 2008 as the youngest player in the top 10, top-ranked Argentine, and highest-ranked South American.

2009: US Open champion, Year-End Finals final, top 5

Del Potro began his 2009 season at the Heineken Open in Auckland, New Zealand, del Potro was the top seed. He defeated American Sam Querrey in the final to win the title, the fifth of his career. Seeded eighth at the Australian Open, he beat Marin Čilić in the fourth round. Del Potro's tournament ended in his next match, when he lost in straight sets to Federer. At the BNP Paribas Open, the sixth seed del Potro advanced to the quarterfinals, where he was defeated by world No. 1 Nadal. Del Potro avenged that loss the following week at the Sony Ericsson Open, where he came back from a double break down in the third set at 0–3 to defeat Nadal in the quarterfinals. This was the first time del Potro had defeated Nadal in five meetings. Despite a loss in the semifinals to Murray, del Potro reached a career-high world ranking of No. 5.

In the clay-court season, del Potro was eliminated in the second round of the Monte Carlo Masters by Ivan Ljubičić. In Rome, del Potro beat Victor Troicki and Wawrinka to advance to the quarterfinals, where he was defeated by defending champion Djokovic in straight sets. This meant del Potro's head-to-head record with the Serb was now 0–3. Del Potro then played at the 2009 Madrid Masters. After defeating Murray for the first time in the quarterfinals, he lost to Federer in the semifinals. At the French Open, where he was fifth seed, del Potro defeated Michaël Llodra, Troicki, Andreev, and ninth seed Tsonga en route to the quarterfinals. He then defeated three-time former quarterfinalist Tommy Robredo to get to his first semifinal of a Grand Slam. He was defeated in a close semifinal, where he was leading by a set twice, by eventual champion Federer who, after their match, said: "[Del Potro] is young and strong, I have a lot of respect for him." Prior to this encounter, del Potro had never taken a set from Federer in their five previous career meetings.

At the 2009 Wimbledon Championships, his poor grass-court form from the past continued, as he went down to unseeded Lleyton Hewitt in the second round. In the Davis Cup quarter-final against the Czech Republic, del Potro won his matches against Ivo Minář and Berdych in straight sets, but Argentina still lost the tie 2–3, eliminating them from the competition. A few weeks later, he defeated Hewitt and Fernando González en route to the Washington final. He successfully defended his title against top-seeded Wimbledon finalist Andy Roddick to win his second tournament of the year and become the first player since Andre Agassi to win back-to-back Washington titles. Del Potro played the following week at the Masters 1000 in Montreal, where he was seeded sixth, defeating world No. 2 Nadal in the quarterfinals, his second win in a row over Nadal. He then defeated Roddick in the semifinals, saving a match point, to advance to his first Masters 1000 final, and to improve his head-to-head record against Roddick to 3–0. In the final, he lost against Murray in three sets. He later withdrew from the next Masters 1000 event in Cincinnati due to fatigue.

Seeded sixth at the 2009 US Open, del Potro began by defeating Juan Mónaco and Jürgen Melzer in straight sets, before dropping a set but defeating Köllerer to reach the fourth round. He defeated a resurgent Juan Carlos Ferrero to advance to the quarterfinals for the second consecutive year. Del Potro then advanced to the semifinals by defeating Marin Čilić. Del Potro was down a set and a break, before winning 17 of the final 20 games to win the match. His advance to the semifinals ensured his return to the top 5 in the rankings. He then easily defeated and crushed world No. 3 and reigning Australian Open champion Rafael Nadal in the semifinals to reach his first Grand Slam final. This was his third consecutive victory over Nadal and made him the first Argentine to reach a Grand Slam singles final since Mariano Puerta at the 2005 French Open. In the finals, del Potro rallied from a set and a break down to defeat world No. 1 and five-time defending champion Roger Federer in five sets; his first victory over Federer after six previous defeats, and Federer's first loss in the US Open since 2003. Del Potro stated, "Since [I was] young, I dream with this and take trophy with me", said del Potro, who became the first Argentine male to win the title since Guillermo Vilas in 1977. "I did my dream, and it's unbelievable moment. It's amazing match, amazing people. Everything is perfect." After the match, Federer praised del Potro; "I thought he hung in there and gave himself chances and, in the end, was the better man."

He is the first player since countryman David Nalbandian to defeat Federer at the US Open, and at 198 cm (6 ft 6 in), he is the tallest ever Grand Slam champion, a record he now shares with Marin Čilić, the 2014 US Open winner, and 2021 champion Daniil Medvedev. Besides Nadal and Djokovic, del Potro is the only player to defeat Federer in a Grand Slam final, and the first player to defeat both Nadal and Federer in the same Grand Slam tournament.

Dick Enberg hosted the post-match ceremony during which a victorious del Potro requested to address his fans in Spanish. Enberg declined the request saying that he was running out of time, but went on to list the corporate sponsored prizes del Potro won. A couple of minutes later, del Potro made the same request again, and only then did Enberg relent saying, "Very quickly, in Spanish, he wants to say hello to his friends here and in Argentina." An emotional del Potro finally spoke a few sentences in Spanish to a cheering crowd. Many viewers expressed disappointment with Enberg and broadcaster CBS over the interview. A CBS executive later defended Enberg, noting that the contract with the United States Tennis Association required that certain sponsors receive time during the ceremony.

In his first match since the US Open, del Potro was upset by world No. 189 Édouard Roger-Vasselin in straight sets at the Rakuten Japan Open Tennis Championships in Tokyo. He then lost his second straight match to Melzer in the second round at the Masters 1000 event in Shanghai, retiring while trailing in the second set. This retirement caused concerns over the length of the tennis season. He had to retire again in the Paris Masters quarterfinals when down 0–4 to Radek Štěpánek due to an abdominal injury. In November, del Potro competed in the ATP World Tour Finals, where he lost his first round-robin match against Andy Murray, but he managed to defeat Fernando Verdasco in his second match to keep his hopes alive. After defeating Roger Federer in the following match, he qualified for the semifinals, ousting Murray by the slimmest possible margin of one game. He defeated Robin Söderling in the semifinals, before losing to Nikolay Davydenko in the final. Del Potro finished 2009 as the youngest player in the top 10, top-ranked Argentine, and highest-ranked South American for the second consecutive year.

2010: First wrist injury, out of top 250

Del Potro started his 2010 season at the AAMI Kooyong Classic in Melbourne, Australia with a win over Croatian world No. 24 Ivan Ljubičić. On 11 January, he moved up to a career high world No. 4. He was scheduled to face Frenchman Jo-Wilfried Tsonga on day 2 of the Kooyong Classic exhibition tournament, but withdrew due to a wrist injury. He came into the 2010 Australian Open with the injury not healed, and took a month off after the event. In the fourth round, he fell to eventual semifinalist Marin Čilić.

Following the Australian Open loss, del Potro missed several tournaments, including the Masters tournaments at Indian Wells and Miami, which were touted as potential return dates, due to the persistent wrist injury. Even though he withdrew from the Monte-Carlo Rolex Masters, he regained the world No. 4 ranking, due to Murray's early exit in the second round. He then withdrew from Barcelona and the Rome Masters. On 4 May, del Potro took the option of having an operation to fix the injury. On 19 May, del Potro said he would not defend his US Open title, but if all went well, he would appear after the event, targeting the Paris Masters as a possible comeback. However, on 22 July, the USTA stated that del Potro was expected to defend his US Open crown. The player himself confirmed that his comeback to the tour would be the Thailand Open and said nothing about the New York event. On 2 August, del Potro returned to the practice courts. A week before the start of the US Open, after practicing for two weeks, del Potro withdrew from the event, as he felt he was not ready to compete at the highest level.

After the nine-month break, del Potro confirmed that he would make his return at the 2010 PTT Thailand Open. In his return match, he lost in the first round to Olivier Rochus. He then also played at the 2010 Rakuten Japan Open Tennis Championships, but again lost in the opening round, this time to Feliciano López.

2011: Return to tour, second Davis Cup final
Del Potro began his 2011 season at the Medibank International as a wildcard entry. In the second round, del Potro was defeated by Florian Mayer of Germany in straight sets, despite winning against sixth seed Feliciano López in three sets in the first round. His next tournament would be the first Grand Slam of the year at the 2011 Australian Open, where del Potro was defeated by 21st seed Marcos Baghdatis in the second round. As a result, del Potro slipped further down the rankings to No. 485.

After the Australian Open, he participated in the 2011 SAP Open in San Jose, where he was accepted into the main draw via protected ranking (PR). He reached the semifinals without dropping a set, however he lost to top seed Fernando Verdasco in straight sets. Del Potro's next scheduled tournament was the 2011 Regions Morgan Keegan Championships and the Cellular South Cup, where he was accepted into the main draw via wildcard. Here, he made his second consecutive ATP semifinal, where he lost to top seed, world No. 8, and eventual champion Andy Roddick. To continue preparing for his first ATP Masters event since 2009, del Potro entered the 2011 Delray Beach International Tennis Championships. He defeated Ričardas Berankis, Teymuraz Gabashvili, Kevin Anderson and second seed Mardy Fish, to advance to an ATP-level final stage of a tournament since 2009 at the Barclays World Tour Finals in London. In the final, he defeated an erratic Janko Tipsarević in two sets to get back in the winners circle.

Del Potro's next tournament was the ATP Masters at the 2011 BNP Paribas Open. He reached the semifinals, where he lost to top seeded Rafael Nadal in straight sets. Del Potro then flew to Key Biscayne, Miami to participate in the second ATP Masters of the year at the 2011 Sony Ericsson Open. Del Potro made it to the fourth round, in the third round he defeated world No. 4 Robin Söderling in straight sets, however in the next round he lost to eventual semifinalist Mardy Fish in straight sets.

He then played in 2011 Estoril Open, which was del Potro's first tournament on clay since he lost the 2009 Roland Garros semifinal to the eventual champion Roger Federer. In Estoril, he defeated Fernando Verdasco in the final. On the way to the final, del Potro defeated top seeded Robin Söderling (Who was two time-finalist in the French Open) and dropped just one set in his five matches. After suffering an 8-millimeter tear in his left rectus, del Potro withdrew from 2011 Mutua Madrid Open and did not participate in the 2011 Internazionali BNL d'Italia, but confirmed that he would play the French Open. Del Potro lost to Novak Djokovic in the third round.

Del Potro reached the round of 16 at Wimbledon for the first time by defeating Flavio Cipolla, Olivier Rochus, and Gilles Simon. He then lost to world No. 1 Rafael Nadal, in four sets, in the fourth round. Del Potro returned to the top 20 at world No. 19 for the first time in nearly a year. His next tournament was the Farmers Classic in Los Angeles, where he received a first-round bye as the second seed. He defeated James Blake but was defeated by Ernests Gulbis in the quarterfinals.

At the 2011 Rogers Cup, seeded 16th, del Potro defeated Jarkko Nieminen before losing to Marin Čilić in the second round. At the Western & Southern Masters tournament, del Potro lost to Roger Federer, snapping the two-match winning streak he had against his rival. Del Potro entered the 2011 US Open seeded 18th. He beat Filippo Volandri and Diego Junqueira before losing to Gilles Simon in the third round, thus ending his US Open campaign.

After the US Open, del Potro played in the Davis Cup semifinal against Serbia, winning both of his rubbers against Janko Tipsarević and world No. 1 Novak Djokovic. This helped Argentina to a 3–2 victory over Serbia in the semifinals, booking their place in the final. He then played in the Stockholm Open, losing in the second round to James Blake. He then reached the final in Vienna, losing for the first time to Jo-Wilfried Tsonga. Despite having won the first set, he eventually lost the final. Del Potro then reached the semifinals of the Valencia Open 500, losing to eventual champion Marcel Granollers. He then withdrew from the Paris Masters due to a shoulder injury, wiping out his chances of qualifying for the Year-end championships.

Del Potro played in the Davis Cup Final, with the title on the line and looking to fulfill his childhood dream. He lost in the second rubber to David Ferrer, despite being two sets to one up, eventually losing in a pulsating five-set contest in a match lasting over five hours. With his country down 2–1, del Potro needed to beat Rafael Nadal in the reverse singles to keep the tie going. Del Potro dominated the first set, but could not keep his level up and lost in four sets. For the third time in six years, Argentina lost in the finals of the Davis Cup World Group, this time 3–1.

Del Potro finished the year ranked world No. 11, despite being ranked no. 485 at one stage. He was named 2011 ATP Comeback Player of the Year.

2012: Olympic Bronze, back to top 10

Del Potro's first tournament of the year was the 2012 Apia International Sydney, where he was the top seed. He made it to the quarterfinals after receiving a bye into the second round. He defeated Łukasz Kubot in the second round. In the quarterfinals, he was beaten by Marcos Baghdatis.

In the first round of the 2012 Australian Open, del Potro defeated Adrian Mannarino in four sets. He reached the quarterfinals of the Grand Slam for the second time, losing to Roger Federer in the quarterfinals.

He went on to play in Rotterdam at the 2012 ABN AMRO World Tennis Tournament in Rotterdam, where he was third seed. Here he defeated Tomáš Berdych in order to make it to his first final of an ATP 500 level tournament or higher after returning from his wrist injury in 2010. He lost to Federer in straight sets in the final. At the Open 13 in Marseille, del Potro defeated Davydenko, Gasquet, Tsonga, and Michaël Llodra in the final to get his tenth ATP championship. Del Potro then had a good run in Dubai, reaching the semifinals, then losing to Roger Federer again in straight sets. Del Potro lost in the quarterfinals of the BNP Paribas Open to Federer for the fourth time that year. He made it to the fourth round of the Sony Ericsson Open, but lost to David Ferrer in two sets.

Del Potro started his clay-court campaign of 2012 in the Davis Cup Quarterfinals against Croatia. He won his first rubber against Ivo Karlović and then demolished Marin Čilić in the reverse singles. He continued his clay-court season at the Estoril Open, where he was the defending champion and the top seed. He did not drop a set en route to the finals, where he beat Frenchman Richard Gasquet in straight sets in the final to collect his 11th ATP World Tour title. He next competed in the Madrid Masters as the twelfth seed and defeated Florian Mayer, Mikhail Youzhny, Marin Čilić, Alexandr Dolgopolov, but lost to Tomáš Berdych in the semifinals.

Del Potro played at the second Grand Slam of the year, the French Open, where he was seeded ninth. Del Potro defeated Albert Montañés, Édouard Roger-Vasselin and Marin Čilić. He defeated seventh seed Tomáš Berdych before losing to Roger Federer in the quarterfinals in five sets, after being up two sets to love.

At Wimbledon, del Potro beat Robin Haase, Go Soeda, and Kei Nishikori, before losing to David Ferrer in the fourth round.

At the Olympic Games, also held at the All England Club in Wimbledon, del Potro faced Roger Federer in the semifinals, which resulted in the longest "best of three sets" tennis match by duration in history, lasting four hours and 26 minutes, half an hour longer than the previous record holder, a Milos Raonic – Jo-Wilfried Tsonga match that took place three days earlier; the final set took two hours and 43 minutes. Del Potro lost the match, 6–3, 6–7, 17–19. Less than two hours after this marathon, del Potro took to the tennis court again with Gisela Dulko for their quarterfinal mixed doubles match against Lisa Raymond and Mike Bryan, which they lost. Two days later, del Potro defeated Novak Djokovic in the bronze-medal match. It was del Potro's first victory over Djokovic, excluding a win that occurred in the Davis Cup where Djokovic retired after dropping the first set.

Del Potro returned to hard courts to play at the Rogers Cup, where he was upset by 33-year-old world No. 40 Radek Štěpánek.
Del Potro ended the illustrious career of American tennis star Andy Roddick retiring him by winning their fourth round match before going on to lose in the quarterfinals of the US Open against Djokovic.

In October, del Potro beat qualifier Grega Žemlja to win the Erste Bank Open in Vienna. He then beat Roger Federer to win the Swiss Indoors title, in Basel. The following week, he suffered a third-round loss to Michaël Llodra at the BNP Paribas Masters. During the round-robin stage of the ATP World Tour Finals, he won two of his three matches and qualified for the semifinals, where he was defeated by Djokovic in three sets, after leading by a set and a break.

He ended the year ranked world No. 7, with a 65–17 win–loss record and four titles captured throughout the season.

2013: Wimbledon semifinal, return to top 5
Del Potro began his season at the Australian Open, where he was upset in the third round by Jérémy Chardy in five sets. The next month, he won the Rotterdam Open, beating Gaël Monfils, Ernest Gulbis, Jarkko Nieminen, Grigor Dimitrov in the semifinals, and Julien Benneteau in the final. At Dubai, del Potro beat Marcos Baghdatis, saving three match points, Somdev Devvarman, and Daniel Brands, but lost in the semifinals to eventual winner Novak Djokovic.

At Indian Wells, del Potro defeated Nikolay Davydenko, Björn Phau, and Tommy Haas. In the quarterfinals, he beat Andy Murray for the second time in six matches. In the semifinals, he upset top seed Novak Djokovic, to end the Serb's streak of 22 victories. He then lost in the final to Rafael Nadal. Del Potro withdrew from the clay court season and from the French Open due to a viral infection.

On grass, del Potro began at the 2013 Aegon Championships, where he won his first comeback match in three sets against Xavier Malisse, who had achieved his biggest win at the Queens Club against Novak Djokovic in 2010. Del Potro came back from behind in the third set to take the match. He defeated Daniel Evans, only to be upset in the quarterfinals by Lleyton Hewitt.

At Wimbledon, Del Potro won against Albert Ramos, Jesse Levine, and Grega Žemlja before advancing past the fourth round for the first time in his career, thanks to a win over Andreas Seppi. He then played David Ferrer and, despite slipping badly during the fifth point of the match and aggravating a pre-existing leg injury, requiring over five minutes of treatment and by his own admission being close to forfeiting the match, he recovered to defeat Ferrer in straight sets to advance to his first Grand Slam semifinal since the 2009 US Open without dropping a set. On 5 July, Djokovic defeated him in five sets in 4 hours and 43 minutes, making it the longest semifinal in the history of Wimbledon men's singles.

Starting the US Series, del Potro won the 2013 Citi Open in Washington DC, where he got a first-round bye, and then defeated Ryan Harrison, Bernard Tomic, and Kevin Anderson on his way to the quarterfinals, Tommy Haas in the semifinals, and won the final against John Isner in three sets. Before the final he didn't drop a set. This was his third title at the event and his second of the year. Del Potro reached the semifinals of Western & Southern Open where he won against Nikolay Davydenko, Feliciano López, in the quarterfinals Dmitry Tursunov, and faced Isner again, this time in the semifinals. He lost the match in three sets. Del Potro got to the second round of the US Open, after a four-set victory against Guillermo García-López, only to be upset by Lleyton Hewitt in five sets.

At the 2013 Japan Open, Del Potro beat Marcos Baghdatis, Carlos Berlocq, Alexandr Dolgopolov, and Nicolas Almagro before beating third seed Milos Raonic to win his third title of the year.

In October, Del Potro reached the final of the 2013 Shanghai Rolex Masters, defeating Philipp Kohlschreiber, Tommy Haas, Nicolás Almagro, and Rafael Nadal (for the first time since the semifinals of the 2009 US Open) en route, but eventually losing to defending champion Novak Djokovic in a third-set tiebreak. Later, he beat Roger Federer at the 2013 Swiss Indoors in the final, his fourth title of the year. However, lost to Federer at the 2013 BNP Paribas Masters and in a winner-take-all, round-robin clash in the 2013 ATP World Tour Finals. He finished the year with a 51–16 record, winning four titles overall and $4,294,039. Del Potro was named Argentina's Sportsman of the Year.

2014–2015: Second wrist injury, two years away from tour
Del Potro began his 2014 ATP World Tour season at the Apia International Sydney as the top seed, winning the final of the tournament against defending champion Bernard Tomic in only 53 minutes. It was his fifth title as top seed.

When asked to play for Argentina in the Davis Cup, del Potro declined, arguing problems with the press and the team, and his decision to prioritize his personal career.

At the Australian Open, he won his opening match against Rhyne Williams, but lost to Roberto Bautista-Agut in the second round, having led two sets to one. Despite his second-round loss, del Potro returned to being world No. 4 because David Ferrer made it only to the quarterfinals and thus lost 360 points, whereas del Potro lost only 45 points. After the Australian Open, del Potro required treatment for his left wrist, which has been giving him trouble since 2012.

In February, at the 2014 Rotterdam Open, he eased past Gaël Monfils and Paul-Henri Mathieu in straight sets, but fell to Latvian Ernests Gulbis in the quarterfinals. In the 2014 Dubai Tennis Championships, he retired against Somdev Devvarman after losing the first set due to his wrist injury. The same injury led to his subsequent withdrawal from Masters 1000 series events in Indian Wells and Miami, meaning that del Potro dropped to world No. 8.

Del Potro underwent surgery to repair the problem in his left wrist, missing the rest of the 2014 season.

Del Potro began his 2015 season with wrist pain and was not sure whether he would play Sydney and the 2015 Australian Open. However, at the last minute he decided to play both tournaments. He had not played a tournament since February 2014, but he started the 2015 Apia International Sydney with a straight-sets win against Sergiy Stakhovsky. In the second round, his opponent was world No. 19 and top seed Fabio Fognini. It was a tough test for del Potro, but he proved to be stronger than the Italian. Del Potro was through to the quarterfinals, but lost to Mikhail Kukushkin in two tiebreakers. After his Sydney campaign, he was drawn to play Jerzy Janowicz in the first round of the 2015 Australian Open, del Potro withdrew due to his wrist injury the day before the match started. Del Potro played in Miami and was not seen for nearly a year, undergoing surgery again in June 2015.

2016: Comeback, Olympic Silver, Davis Cup champion
He played his first tournament since undergoing wrist surgery in the 2016 Delray Beach Open. In his first competitive match in almost a year, del Potro defeated Denis Kudla in two sets. He followed this up with a straight sets win over Australian John-Patrick Smith. He defeated Jérémy Chardy in two sets in the quarterfinal, reaching his first semifinal since 2014; which he lost to eventual champion Sam Querrey. He returned to Indian Wells, competing in the first round, winning against Tim Smyczek in two sets. He lost in the next round to Tomas Berdych in straight sets. His next tournament was the Miami Open. He won his first match against countryman Guido Pella in two sets. He was set to play Roger Federer for the first time in more than two years, but just hours before the match Federer withdrew due to a stomach virus. He then played lucky loser and countryman Horacio Zeballos and lost in straight sets. He then competed in his first clay-court tournament since 2013 at the BMW Open. He won his first clay-court match in three years against Dustin Brown, beating him in two sets.

In his second match of the tournament, he beat Jan-Lennard Struff in his first three-set match of the year. He then lost to Philipp Kohlschreiber in the quarterfinals in straight sets. The next tournament he entered was the 2016 Mutua Madrid Open. He had his best victory after coming back on the tour, defeating 14th seed Dominic Thiem in straight sets. He lost his next match to Jack Sock in two sets. He then competed at the 2016 MercedesCup. His first grass tournament since 2013 Wimbledon Championships. He started off against Grigor Dimitrov, winning in straight sets. He then saw off John Millman in two sets. He faced fourth seed Gilles Simon in the quarterfinal, emerging victorious in three sets. He then played seventh seed Philipp Kohlschreiber, who had defeated him earlier this year at the 2016 BMW Open, losing in straight sets.

He entered Wimbledon and was drawn against Frenchman Stephane Robert. He defeated Robert to set up a second-round match with fourth seed Stanislas Wawrinka, whom he defeated in four sets. Del Potro then lost in four sets against 32nd seed Lucas Pouille in the third round.

In the 2016 Olympic Games, del Potro defeated top seed and world no. 1 Novak Djokovic in the first round. It was a huge win for him because he was ranked no. 145 in the world and was coming back from a bad injury. He also defeated João Sousa and Taro Daniel in three sets. Next, he defeated top-20 player Roberto Bautista Agut to guarantee a medal match. He played 2008 gold medalist and the 2016 doubles gold medalist, Rafael Nadal. He defeated him in three tight sets to guarantee a medal. Del Potro played in his first gold medal match against the reigning Wimbledon champion from the previous month, Andy Murray. He lost in four grueling sets in over four hours. However, del Potro said after beating Nadal "I already won silver, that's good enough for me."

After the Olympics, del Potro was granted a wild card to the US Open. He was drawn against countryman Diego Schwartzman and defeated him in straight sets. In the second round, he faced and defeated 19th seed and top-ranked American Steve Johnson in straight sets, fighting back from down a break during both the first and second sets. In the third round, he faced 11th seed and Grand Slam finalist David Ferrer, and again defeated him in straight sets. In the fourth round, he faced 8th seed Dominic Thiem. After del Potro won the first set, the match ended when Thiem retired during the second set. Del Potro then lost to eventual champion Stan Wawrinka in the quarterfinals in four sets. Del Potro then played against Murray in a rematch of the Olympic final in the Davis Cup. Del Potro won the thrilling 5-set match in 5 hours and 7 minutes. In his next tournament, del Potro played in the 2016 Shanghai Rolex Masters, where he was drawn to play 11th seed David Goffin. Despite being a set and a break up, del Potro eventually lost the match. After this, del Potro was given a wild card into the Stockholm Open. Del Potro beat John Isner, Nicolas Almagro, Ivo Karlovic, and Grigor Dimitrov on his way to the final. In the final, del Potro cruised to victory over Jack Sock to win his first title since his return from injury. Del Potro then played at the 2016 Swiss Indoors, where he comfortably beat qualifier Robin Haase in the first round. He then got revenge on Goffin in a straight sets win, before falling in 2 tight sets to Kei Nishikori in the quarterfinals.

Vying for Argentina's first title, del Potro played in the 2016 Davis Cup against Croatia. His first match was a four set victory against Ivo Karlović. Partnering Leonardo Mayer, del Potro lost in doubles against Ivan Dodig and Marin Cilic. 2–1 down in matches, del Potro played in singles against Cilic, coming back from 2 sets down for the first time in his career to win in five sets. Described as one of the best Davis Cup comebacks ever, del Potro levelled the score at 2–2, paving the way for Federico Delbonis to complete the comeback by beating Ivo Karlović in straight sets, thus claiming Argentina's first ever Davis Cup title.

2017: Continued comeback, US Open semis
Del Potro decided to skip the 2017 Australian Open and made his season debut at the Delray Beach Open, where he was seeded in a tournament for the first time in three years, at No. 7, and won his first three matches against Kevin Anderson, Damir Dzumhur and Sam Querrey, who beat him in the semifinals of the same tournament last year. However, in the semifinals this year, del Potro lost to top seed and world No. 4 Milos Raonic in straight sets. Next, del Potro played in the Mexican Open, where he was drawn to play qualifier Frances Tiafoe, who idolised del Potro when he was a child. In the end, del Potro won an extremely tight match in three sets. In the next round, del Potro played the top seed of the tournament for the second time in a row. This time it was Novak Djokovic on the other side of the court. Del Potro lost in three sets after winning the first set.

Del Potro next played at the Indian Wells Masters. Del Potro was seeded 31st so he received a bye into the second round, where he played his Argentine Davis Cup teammate Federico Delbonis. He won in two tight sets. In the next round, Del Potro faced Djokovic again, with the same result, Del Potro losing in three sets. After, Del Potro played at the Miami Open, where he had a comfortable victory over Robin Haase before losing to Roger Federer.

Del Potro began his clay-court season at the Estoril Open, where he beat Yuichi Sugita for the loss of just 4 games in the first round. However, the day after his victory, Del Potro heard that his grandfather died and subsequently withdrew from the tournament.

Del Potro withdrew from the Madrid Open, reappearing at the Italian Open where he reached the quarterfinals of a Masters 1000 tournament for the first time since the 2013 Paris Masters, following victories over 10th seed Grigor Dimitrov, Kyle Edmund and 7th seed Kei Nishikori, which was his first victory in 2017 over a top 10 ranked player. However, he succumbed yet again to world No. 2 Novak Djokovic in straight sets.

Del Potro then competed at the newly formed Lyon Open, where he defeated lucky loser Quentin Halys, but lost in the next round against Portuguese qualifier Gastão Elias in straight sets. Doubt was cast over his participation at the French Open because of a back injury that had hampered him at Lyon, but he eventually decided to partake in the event. Del Potro entered as the 29th seed, the first time since the 2014 Australian Open that he was seeded at a Grand Slam tournament. In the first round, Del Potro defeated Guido Pella in straight sets, and in the second round against Nicolas Almagro, it was one set apiece before Almagro retired. Del Potro eventually fell in straight sets to top seed Andy Murray in the third round.

After suffering an early second round exit at Wimbledon, Del Potro began his summer North American hard court season at Washington, where he lost to Kei Nishikori in the third round. He then lost to Denis Shapovalov in the second round of Montreal, and to eventual champion Grigor Dimitrov in the third round of Cincinnati.

At the US Open, Del Potro defeated Henri Laaksonen, Adrián Menéndez-Maceiras and Roberto Bautista Agut in straight sets, putting his best year performance to date against Bautista Agut. He began his fourth round match against Dominic Thiem greatly struggling, falling two sets behind. However, he then raised his level and, with the help of the crowd, he eventually prevailed in five sets, including saving two match points in the fourth set with two aces. In the post match interview he admitted he considered retiring from the match during the second set.

The US Open account on Instagram switched his racquet for Thor's hammer using software editing tools, which created a new nickname for the Argentine: Juan Martin "del Thortro", by fellow tennis player Roger Federer, adding to a collection of nicknames such as "Delpo", "Tower of Tandil", "Palito" (stick) and "Enano" (midget). This led to a joke in social media with Chris Hemsworth, who plays Thor, and in this joke he demands his hammer back because he claimed to need it for his quests.

In the quarterfinals he defeated Roger Federer in four tight sets; his second victory over the Swiss at the US Open, having beaten him in the final in 2009. By doing so he reached his first major semifinal since Wimbledon 2013. His run came to an end in 4 sets, losing to World No. 1 Rafael Nadal.

Del Potro began his Asian hard court swing in Beijing, where he lost in straight sets Grigor Dimitrov in the second round, his second loss against the Bulgarian. This was followed by a strong performance at the 2017 Shanghai Masters, where he reached the semifinals of a Masters 1000 event for the first time since 2013 (also in Shanghai), most notably upsetting Alexander Zverev in the third round, his second triumph over a Top 5 ranked opponent after his previous victory over Roger Federer at the 2017 US Open. Del Potro won the first set but eventually lost in the semifinals against Federer, who would go on to win the tournament.

Del Potro defended his 2016 Stockholm Open title by defeating Grigor Dimitrov in the finals of the 2017 Stockholm Open. This victory gave Del Potro his 20th ATP career title. He then reached the final of Basel, where he faced Federer and again lost in three sets after winning the first. Del Potro then made it to the quarterfinals of the 2017 Paris Masters, where he was one win away from entering the top 10 and qualifying for the 2017 ATP Finals, which would've been his first time since 2013 participating in the year-end tournament. However, he was defeated in three sets by John Isner and subsequently declined to be chosen as an alternate for the tournament, instead choosing to rest with his family and friends in his native Tandil. Nevertheless, Del Potro won 730 points in a span of three weeks and reached the 11th spot of the ATP rankings.

2018: First Masters, second US Open final, world No. 3, injuries

Del Potro started the season at the 2018 ASB Classic in New Zealand, where he debuted with a victory against Denis Shapovalov. This triumph assured his return to the top 10 of the ATP rankings for the first time since August 2014. Del Potro then defeated Karen Khachanov and David Ferrer en route to the final, where he lost to Roberto Bautista Agut in three sets.
At the Australian Open 2018 he lost in the third round against Tomáš Berdych. Despite this, he returned to the top ten ranked world no 9, the first time since August 2014. Del Potro then competed at the Delray Beach Open. However, he lost to eventual champion Frances Tiafoe. He then won the Acapulco Open, defeating Kevin Anderson in straight sets to obtain his 21st title, and his biggest title since 2013 Swiss Indoors.

His winning streak would not stop there, however, as he went on to win the BNP Paribas Open, the first Masters 1000 tournament of his career. He received a bye into the second round, where he started his successful run by defeating teenager Alex De Minaur, veteran David Ferrer, compatriot Leonardo Mayer, 31st seed Philipp Kohlschreiber and 32nd seed Milos Raonic en route to the final. There, he faced reigning champion and world No.1 Roger Federer. Del Potro prevailed in three sets despite Federer serving for the match in the decider and holding 3 championship points. This was del Potro's biggest achievement in the ATP Tour after the 2009 US Open.

Del Potro continued his impressive run at the Miami Open, again starting from the second round as a seeded player. He defeated Robin Haase, 26th seed Kei Nishikori and 22nd seed Filip Krajinović, before facing off in the quarterfinals against 20th seed Milos Raonic in a rematch of their previous duel. Delpo managed to once again prevail in a grueling match against the Canadian, reaching the semifinals. His streak finally ended as he was defeated by 14th seed and eventual champion John Isner.

Delpo would then return to the courts for the clay season, although his first results were unexpectedly lackluster. After starting the Madrid Open with a solid victory against Bosnian Damir Džumhur in the second round, he was upset by qualifier Dušan Lajović in three sets. In his next tournament in Rome, del Potro defeated rising star Stefanos Tsitsipas before retiring against David Goffin in the next round due to a leg injury.

The Argentine managed to recover in time for the French Open and entered the tournament as the fifth seed. Following victories against French players Nicolas Mahut and Julien Benneteau, he defeated 31st seed Albert Ramos Viñolas and World N°10 John Isner en route to a quarterfinal clash against World N°4 and frequent rival Marin Cilic. After an intense match (in which he had a heated argument with a fan that supposedly heckled him), Del Potro defeated Cilic in four sets and reached the semifinals, his best performance at Roland Garros since 2009. He then lost to Rafael Nadal in straight sets. His run to the semifinals ensured that, for the first time since February 2014, Delpo would return to his career-best ranking of World No. 4.

At Wimbledon, Del Potro defeated Peter Gojowczyk, Feliciano Lopez and Benoit Paire in straight sets to set up a round of 16 clash with Gilles Simon. He went on to beat Simon in 4 sets over two days and in nearly  hours to set up another meeting with World No. 1 Rafael Nadal, who defeated him in 5 sets. Del Potro then competed at the Los Cabos Open, where he reached the final but lost to Fabio Fognini.

Del Potro was seeded third at the Rogers Cup, but withdrew due to an injury to his left wrist. Nonetheless, due to Alexander Zverev's loss in the quarterfinals, del Potro moved up to a new career-high ranking of World No. 3 as of the week of 13 August.

Del Potro was seeded fourth at Cincinnati, defeating Chung Hyeon and Nick Kyrgios before falling to David Goffin in the quarterfinals.

Entering the US Open seeded third, del Potro reached the quarterfinals without dropping a set, defeating Donald Young, Denis Kudla, 31st seed Fernando Verdasco, and 20th seed Borna Ćorić. He then faced 11th seed John Isner, defeating him in four sets to reach his second consecutive US Open semifinal, where he faced top seed and defending champion Rafael Nadal in a rematch of the previous year's semifinal. Nadal retired from the match due to a knee injury after del Potro took the first two sets. With this victory, del Potro advanced to his second Grand Slam final, nine years after his 2009 US Open triumph. He was defeated by two-time champion Novak Djokovic, 6–3, 7–6(7–4) 6–3.

Del Potro entered the China Open as the top seed. He defeated Albert Ramos Viñolas, Karen Khachanov, Filip Krajinović, and reached the final without dropping a set after Fabio Fognini retired before the start of their semifinal match. He faced unseeded Nikoloz Basilashvili in the final, losing 4–6, 4–6.

He then competed in the Shanghai Masters seeded third. He defeated Richard Gasquet and faced 13th seed Borna Ćorić in the third round, narrowly dropping the first set before he retired due to a knee injury. This injury later forced his withdrawal from the rest of the season and the ATP Finals, for which he had qualified for the first time since 2013.

2019–2021: Continued injuries
Del Potro's injury lingered into the 2019 season, forcing him to withdraw from the Australian Open. He made his comeback at Delray Beach Open where he reached the quarterfinals, losing to Mackenzie McDonald in three sets. Still not having recovered from injury, Del Potro chose not to defend his titles in Acapulco and Indian Wells, withdrawing from both tournaments.

Playing in his first tournament back at the Madrid Open, del Potro lost his first match to Laslo Đere. He then played in Rome and secured wins against David Goffin, who had a 3–1 lead over him before the match, and Casper Ruud. He squandered two match points in a second set tiebreaker to ultimately lose his quarterfinal against world number 1 Novak Djokovic over a three-hour match.

In the French Open, del Potro was seeded 8th but lost in the fourth round to Karen Khachanov.

In his first grass tournament of the season at Queen's Club, del Potro suffered another career-threatening injury when he fractured his kneecap in his first round match against Denis Shapovalov.

Del Potro did not play any professional tennis from 2019 at Queen's Club until 2022 at the Argentina Open. He underwent four right knee surgeries (June 2019, January 2020, August 2020 and March 2021) and withdrew from the Tokyo Olympics in July. At the 2021 US Open, del Potro reported that his knee was getting better, he had picked up training on the court again and hoped to be ready to play on the tour within a couple of months.

2022: Return to professional tennis, potential retirement
On 31 January, it was announced that Del Potro will make his return to professional tennis at the 2022 Argentina Open, where he accepted a wild card. He also accepted a wild card to play the 2022 Rio Open.

On 5 February, Del Potro stated in a press conference that it is likely he will retire after the 2022 Argentina Open. He has cited ongoing knee pain due to an injury as a reason behind the potential retirement and that his return is 'maybe more of a farewell than a comeback'. Del Potro lost in the first round of the Argentina Open to Federico Delbonis, and again hinted at retirement in the post-match interview. He withdrew from the 2022 Rio Open on 11 February. Del Potro has not played any matches since; he dropped out of the singles rankings on 20 June, as well as the doubles rankings on 9 May.

Playing style

Del Potro is an offensive baseliner with a very powerful serve and a deep, flat, topspin groundstroke, where he pushes his opponents deeper with his heavy groundstroke and trying to blast past them with a winner. His forehand is one of his main strengths and possibly the most powerful in the game, capable of frequently generating speeds more than 160 km/h. It is widely considered among the top three best forehands on tour by fellow players and analysts, alongside Roger Federer and Rafael Nadal.

Although he possessed a very consistent and powerful double-handed backhand, injury and surgeries on his wrist have rendered his backhand the main weakness in his game. Since his return in 2016, del Potro made tactical changes in his game in order to protect his wrist, like significantly reducing the pace of his two-hander and adopting a one-handed slice. Despite del Potro admitting that relying on slices is "not my game," the shot has been effective in moving his opponents out of position and slowing down rallies enough to allow him to set up powerful offensive shots with his forehand. Furthermore, to compensate for the newfound vulnerability in his backhand wing, del Potro has improved the power and accuracy of his other shots, most notably his serve.

Equipment and apparel
Del Potro used the Wilson Hyper ProStaff 6.1 Midplus Stretch early on in his career, and has continued to use this racquet under new paint jobs years later. Del Potro is very superstitious, and after suffering a wrist injury shortly after switching to the Wilson BLX Pro Tour paint job in 2010, he returned to playing with the then outdated Wilson K-Factor 6.1 95 paint job. He particularly favored the exact racquets he had used to win his only Grand Slam title at the 2009 US Open. He again refused to update his racquet to the Wilson BLX Juice Pro in 2012, and in 2014 had only a few K-Factor racquets left. For strings, he uses Luxilon ALU Power strung at 58 lbs. He currently makes use of the same racket painted to resemble the Wilson ProStaff 97.

His clothing sponsor is Nike. He used to wear sleeveless shirts, but more recently has worn crew shirts, and often also sports double-wide wristbands and a bandana. For shoes, he wears Nike Air Max Cages.

Record against the Big Four
Del Potro has a combined  record against all members of the Big Four, which is one of the best in this category. He is also one of the few to have won at least three matches against each of the four.

Roger Federer
Del Potro has a  record against Roger Federer, and a  record in final. Besides the 2009 US Open title, del Potro also captured the 2012 and 2013 Swiss Indoors finals and the 2018 Indian Wells final, while Federer won the 2012 Rotterdam Open and the 2017 Basel Open. Federer won their a five-set meeting at the 2009 French Open semifinals, and the longest best-of-three-set match in history at the 2012 Olympic semifinal, 19–17 in the deciding set. Del Potro prevailed in the 2017 US Open quarterfinals against Federer in four sets.

Novak Djokovic
Del Potro has a  record against Novak Djokovic. Djokovic won their first four meetings, before back to back victories for del Potro at the 2011 Davis Cup and their bronze medal match at the 2012 Summer Olympics in straight sets. However, in 2013, Djokovic won two of the most important matches between them to date; an epic five-setter at the 2013 Wimbledon Championships semifinals and a thrilling three-setter at the 2013 Shanghai Masters final. In the same year, del Potro defeated Djokovic en route to his second Masters 1000 final, at the 2013 Indian Wells Masters. Del Potro upset Djokovic in the first round at the 2016 Rio Olympics en route to the silver medal. Djokovic defeated Del Potro in three close sets in the final of the 2018 US Open, which was the first grand slam final for Del Potro since his victory at the 2009 US Open. Three of his four victories have come via national representation tournaments.

Rafael Nadal
Del Potro has a  record against Rafael Nadal. Del Potro bested Nadal in the semifinals en route to his 2009 US Open title which was the first time a player managed to beat both Roger Federer and Nadal in the same Grand Slam tournament (Novak Djokovic did this at the US Open 2011). However the Spaniard managed to win both times in the Indian Wells Masters encounters, in the 2011 semifinal and the 2013 final. Nadal also won the fourth and last rubber of the 2011 Davis Cup final against the Argentine. Del Potro gained the upper hand at the 2013 Shanghai Masters, defeating Nadal to reach the final where he lost to Djokovic. Del Potro defeated Nadal in a third set tiebreak in the semifinal of the 2016 Olympics in Rio de Janeiro, while Nadal stopped Del Potro's 2017 US Open run, defeating him in a 4-set semifinal. In the quarterfinals of 2018 Wimbledon, Nadal came from two sets to one down to defeat Del Potro in an epic five-set match. In their most recent meeting, Del Potro advanced to the final of the US Open when Nadal had to retire, while trailing by two sets to love.

Andy Murray
Del Potro has a  record against Andy Murray. They only played two finals. The first was in the 2009 Rogers Cup, which was won by Murray. However, when del Potro beat Murray in the quarterfinals of the 2013 BNP Paribas Open, del Potro won against all members of the Big Four in 2013. In their second final, del Potro lost to Murray in the 2016 Summer Olympics. However, during Argentina's Davis Cup semi-final tie against Great Britain, del Potro got revenge by beating Andy Murray in a five set thriller that was both men's longest match of their careers.

Off the court 
Del Potro dated singer Jimena Baron from April 2017 until February 2018. Del Potro dated model Sofia Jimenez from December 2018 until their breakup in May 2020.

In 2022, it was revealed that Daniel del Potro (Juan Martín's late father) had misappropriated US$30 million of his son's career earnings while managing his financial affairs.

Career statistics

Grand Slam tournament performance timeline

Grand Slam tournament finals

Singles: 2 (1 title, 1 runner-up)

Olympic medal matches

Singles: 2 (1 silver medal, 1 bronze medal)

Year-end championship finals

Singles: 1 (1 runner-up)

Notes

References

External links

Profiles
 
 
 
 
 
 
 

1988 births
Living people
Argentine male tennis players
Argentine people of Italian descent
Argentine Roman Catholics
People from Tandil
US Open (tennis) champions
Tennis players at the 2012 Summer Olympics
Tennis players at the 2016 Summer Olympics
Olympic tennis players of Argentina
Olympic bronze medalists for Argentina
Olympic medalists in tennis
Grand Slam (tennis) champions in men's singles
Medalists at the 2012 Summer Olympics
Medalists at the 2016 Summer Olympics
Olympic silver medalists for Argentina
Sportspeople from Buenos Aires Province